Mezquita As-Salam is a Sunni Muslim mosque located in the Chilean capital of Santiago. The building was completed in 1989, and was the first mosque in Chile.

See also
  List of mosques in the Americas
  Lists of mosques 
 Islam in Chile

References

Buildings and structures in Santiago
Buildings and structures completed in 1989
1989 establishments in Chile
Mosques in Chile